Stiletto is the fourth studio album by the American musician Lita Ford. It includes the singles "Hungry" and "Lisa". The album peaked at No. 52 on the Billboard 200. Ford supported the album by touring with Mötley Crüe.

Production
The album was produced by Mike Chapman. "Lisa" is about Ford's mother. "Only Women Bleed" is a cover of the Alice Cooper song. Ford employed synthesized strings and horns on the album.

Critical reception

The Los Angeles Times wrote that "Ford rides her sex-bomb goddess image, serviceable vocals and one o' the lads guitarwork hard 'n' heavy for almost one full side of this LP." The Calgary Herald determined that "Stiletto abandons wallowing in past sub-par metal yearnings and instead tries a more mainstream approach."

The Vancouver Sun opined that Ford "just doesn't have the heavy metal vocal screech or the powerthud music to make her songs more than mildly amusing." The Orlando Sentinel panned the "stupid lyrics and ... bombastic guitar solos."

Track listing
Side one
 "Your Wake Up Call" (Mike Chapman, David Ezrin, Lita Ford, Myron Grombacher, Don Nossov) – 1:59
 "Hungry" (Michael Dan Ehmig, Ford) – 4:57
 "Dedication" (Chapman) – 3:34
 "Stiletto" (Ford, Holly Knight) – 4:37
 "Lisa" (Ehmig, Ford) – 4:45
 "The Ripper" (Ezrin, Ford) – 5:20

Side two
"Big Gun" (Ford, Grombacher, Nossov) – 4:37
 "Only Women Bleed" (Alice Cooper, Dick Wagner) – 6:03
 "Bad Boy" (Ford, Mark Spiro) – 3:59
 "Aces & Eights" (Ford, Grombacher, Kevin Savigar) – 4:20
 "Cherry Red" (Ehmig, Ford) – 4:09
 "Outro" (Ezrin, Ford, Grombacher, Nossov) – 1:56

Personnel
Band members
Lita Ford – guitar, vocals
David Ezrin – keyboards
Don Nossov – bass guitar
Myron Grombacher – drums, percussion

Additional musicians
Pablo Calagero - baritone saxophone
Richie Cannata - tenor saxophone, horns arrangements
Barry Danelian - trumpet
Kevin Osborne - trombone, backing vocals, horns arrangements
Mike Chapman, Tim Lawless, Ozzie Melendez - backing vocals
Ralph Schuckett - strings arrangements

Production
Mike Chapman - producer, mixing
Marc DeSisto, Steve Marcantonio, Brian McGee, Dave Wittman - engineers
Neal Avron, Dan Hetzel, Mike Kloster, Jay Newland, Ingrid M. Paaske, Steve Rossi, Tommy Skarupa, Vic Steffans, Ted Trewhalla, Thomas R. Yezzi - assistant engineers
Ted Trewhalla, William Wittman - mixing
George Marino at Sterling Sound, NYC - mastering

Charts

References

Lita Ford albums
1990 albums
RCA Records albums
Albums produced by Mike Chapman